Rain or Shine is a live album by O.A.R. which was recorded on June 18 and June 19, 2009 at Charter One Pavilion in Chicago, Illinois. The live album includes all 37 tracks that were played during those two nights on a four–disc set with over four hours of music. Released on January 12, 2010, Rain or Shine is O.A.R.'s tenth released album, and fourth released live album.

Openers scheduled for the two shows were Robert Randolph and the Family Band (night one) and The Wailers (night two), however, because of the horrible weather on the second night, the Wailers did not play at all. Robert Randolph was a guest performer on his steel pedal guitar for the song "Fool in the Rain" on night one, which is a song originally written by Led Zeppelin.

On the second night, O.A.R. almost cancelled the show because of the rain and lightning. After a two-hour delay, Marc Roberge (lead vocals, guitar) said that they were literally minutes from calling the whole thing off but then they heard the fans chanting in the parking lot and they decided to have the show. The lightning let up, but the rain continued intermittently throughout the night. O.A.R. was able to perform a full set, despite having to make changes to their stage set-up because of the effect of the weather.

Track listing

Night one

Disc one

Disc two

Night two

Disc three

Disc four

Personnel
O. A. R.
Chris Culos - drums, percussion
Jerry DePizzo - saxophone, electric guitar, percussion, background vocals
Benj Gershman - bass guitar
Richard On - lead guitar, background vocals
Marc Roberge - lead vocals, acoustic and electric rhythm guitars

Additional Musicians
Mikel Paris - keyboards, percussion, vocals
Robert Randolph of the Family Band - steel pedal guitar on "Fool In The Rain"

References

O.A.R. albums
2010 live albums